The Thompson Cottage, also called the James Marshall Cottage, was a tenant farmer's house built by James Marshall about the time of the American Revolution.  It is located in Concord Township, Delaware County, Pennsylvania.

A free black, Thomas Thompson, bought the house and 2 acres in 1847. He and his descendants lived there until 1971. It is an excellent example of an unaltered eighteenth century tenant farmer's homestead. The building was built sometime after 1774.

It was added to the National Register of Historic Places on April 13, 1977.

See also
National Register of Historic Places listings in Delaware County, Pennsylvania

References

Houses on the National Register of Historic Places in Pennsylvania
Houses completed in 1775
Houses in Delaware County, Pennsylvania
National Register of Historic Places in Delaware County, Pennsylvania